Georges Gilles (16 December 1923 – 14 December 2010) was a French racing cyclist. He rode in the 1954 Tour de France.

References

1923 births
2010 deaths
French male cyclists
Place of birth missing